Meyer Velkovich Basin (8 June 1890 – 20 September 1918) was a member of the Military Revolutionary Committee of the Caucasian Army.

One of the 26 Baku Commissars who were Bolshevik and Left Socialist-Revolutionaries members of the Baku Soviet Commune that was established in the city of Baku after the October Revolution. The commune was led by Stepan Shahumyan until 26 July 1918 when the Bolsheviks were forced out of power by a coalition of Dashnaks, Right Socialist-Revolutionaries and Mensheviks. After the overthrow, the Baku commissars attempted to escape but were captured by the White Army and placed in a Baku prison. On 14 September Red Army soldiers broke into the prison and freed the commissars who then boarded a ship to Krasnovodsk, where they were promptly arrested, and on the night of 20 September 1918 executed by a firing squad between the stations of Pereval and Akhcha-Kuyma of the Transcaspian Railway.

On 28 August 1918, while under arrest, he was elected to the council of Baku, as a representative of the Bolshevik party.

1890 births
1918 deaths
Jews from the Russian Empire
Belarusian Jews
Belarusian communists
Executed politicians
Bolsheviks|
People from Cherykaw
Articles containing video clips